Declaration of Rights may refer to:

Declaration of Right, 1689, which led to the Bill of Rights 1689, enacted by the Parliament of England
Declaration of Rights and Grievances, 1765 colonial protest in North America to the British Stamp Act
Declaration and Resolves of the First Continental Congress, 1774 enumeration of colonial rights early in the American Revolution
Virginia Declaration of Rights, adopted in Virginia in 1776  
Declaration of the Rights of Man and of the Citizen, adopted in France in 1789
Declaration of the Rights of Woman and the Female Citizen, written in France in 1791
Declaration of the Rights of Man and Citizen of 1793, written in France in 1793
Declaration of the Rights of the Negro Peoples of the World, adopted at the 1920 Universal Negro Improvement Association convention
Universal Declaration of Human Rights, adopted by the United Nations General Assembly in 1948 
Declaration on the Rights of Indigenous Peoples by the United Nations General Assembly in 2007
"Declaration of Rights", a song by the reggae group The Abyssinians